Glenmore is a village in County Kilkenny, Ireland. It lies just off the N25 road close to the border between County Kilkenny and County Wexford. Glenmore GAA is the local Gaelic Athletic Association club, and Glenmore National School is the local primary (national) school. Saint James's Catholic Church in Glenmore was built in 1813.

Irish language
Baile Shéamais, in Glenmore, was home to Pádraig Paor (also known as Patrick Power) who is believed to have been the last traditional native speaker of the Irish language in Co. Kilkenny. Audio-recordings were made of his speech in 1936 for the Irish Folklore Commission (Coimisiún Béaloideasa Éireann) by Séamus Ó Duilearga and Risteárd A Breatnach.

People
Tom Mullally, hurling manager

See also
 Rose Fitzgerald Kennedy Bridge - nearby roadbridge

References

Towns and villages in County Kilkenny